Simón Bross (born February 22, 1960) is a Mexican director and producer.

As a director in advertising he has won at the world's most important festivals: London International Advertising Awards, New York Festival,  FIAP, Círculo de Oro, Clio Awards, and  Cannes Lions.

He is the first (and only) Mexican director to be named member of FIAP's "Hall of fame". 
Also, Círculo Creativo de México  gave him a special tribute for his career in the advertising industry. The Gunn Report (England) ranked him among the world's best advertising film directors.
He also won the award Volcán de Oro in the  Festival Pantalla de Cristal for his brilliant career achievements (including other mentions).

He also directs and produces for television. He participated as executive producer in "Diario de un cocinero", which won an award for best TV program by the Travel + Leisure magazine.
In feature film area he has produced such movies as Who the Hell is Juliette? (Second Century, "Elvira", Carrière 250/Jean Claude Carrière, as well short film.  Produces and directs "Bad Habits" and presents in the Cannes Film Festival.
After, Morelia Film festival awarded him for his film trajectory.
Today he produces and directs fiction films, documentaries, short films, TV series and advertising films.

He produces commercial films such as "We Are The Nobles" and documentary films like  Devil´s Freedom which in 2017 was the winner for best feature in the Guadalajara International Film Festival and the Documentary Amnesty International prize in the Berlin International Film Festival.

He´s also producer in  La 4a Compañía directed by Mitzi Vanessa Arreola and Amir Galván Cervera, which recently won 10 awards  Premio Ariel  including Best Feature Film, as well as producing the lauded documentary Witkin & Witkin.

Today 

He will be the president of the production jury at the FIAP 2020.

In 2020 he was summoned in the Creative Circle to give his talk entitled "I remember."

On October 22, 2019, the vice president of Festival Internacional de Cine de Morelia(FICM), Cuauhtémoc Cárdenas Batel, in the company of director Fabián Ibarra and producer Simón Bross, presented the film El Gallinero in the 17th edition of the festival.

He was honored by the Universidad Iberoamericana.

As a member of the Jury for D&AD Creative Advertising Festival 2018, he was in charge, along with other members of the jury, with awarding the prestigious Black Pencil. 

President of the Jury at the Ibero-American Advertising Festival (FIAP) 2017.

President of the jury in the Area of Audiovisual Production Techniques at the FIAP 2015. Invited to the New York Festival 2015 as a Jury in the Grand Jury / Film Craft area.

GARCIABROSS (producer of Simón Bross) together with Gray Mexico and our director Pedro Armendáriz won 4 Cannes lions (2 Oros,1 Plata, 1 Bronce) with the Paper Glasses project at Cannes Lions 2016.

He´s also producer in La 4a Compañía directed by Mitzi Vanessa Arreola and Amir Galván Cervera, which recently won 10 awards Premio Ariel including Best Feature Film. 

Together with Inna Payán and Roberto Garza he co-produces the documentary La Libertad del Diablo by Everardo González which has won several awards, among which Amnesty International for Documentaries of the Berlinale of the Berlin International Film Festival and the prize for best documentary at the Guadalajara International Film Festival. He also won the Ariel Award for Best Documentary Feature.

He is also executive producer in the successful Mexican feature film "Nosotros los Nobles"

Producer of the Short Film Matices, directed by Saúl Masri, who won the Best Drama Short Award at the KisaKes Festival in Turkey and 1st place at the Jewish Film Festival.

President of the jury Craft Audiovisual - Craft Audio - Craft Digital at the 32nd Festival of Circulo de Oro

Opinions 

"Simón works in favor of the idea and not for the production. His contributions as a director always make creative ideas richer. I don’t know how but if there's an idea that starts in A, he takes it to Z. He's got magic and he perfectly knows how to get the brand the added values it needs and raise its sales to the point it makes fortunes. It's important to highlight that his success is not searching  for awards, he doesn’t live for them. He's success is due to the effectiveness of his commercials; they raise sales and make  great business for the clients." -José Becker

"Simón Bross is a director who respects the creative idea. He is impeccable in production and brilliant directing actors. He is very clear that production values go in function of the creative idea (script), and he knows how to maximize those values. In addition, he's totally honest when it comes to giving feedback of the creative ideas. He always finds the way to make the idea richer and establish clear production criteria (meaning he finds the right actor, location and other elements that were visualized in the initial idea).
He directs commercials in a very special way: he achieves credibility and makes the target identified with them. We work in each commercial just as we would work on a feature film: my creative labor is to make the script and then he takes that idea into the screen taking care of each element on the scene." -Lourdes Lamasney

"Simón has a great passion for advertising and he adds a lot to all the creative ideas he directs. He cares that the consumer gets connected to the ideas. He analyzes how to make commercials that we’ll be remembered and will not get lost." -Tony Hidalgo

"Simón has a great criteria to the select creative ideas he wants to direct. When he detects a good idea he knows how to get close to the creative to make it even better. Working with him is like working with another creative, the only difference is that he directs and he also knows the bases of advertising." –Yuri Alvarado.

"Simon knows exactly what to do and know how to do the main thing , which helps to enrich the scripts achieving their business connect with people in seconds. " Tebo Samaniego.

Mentions, awards and nominations 
 Premio Ariel (2017)
 Award: Best Feature Film   (La 4a Compañía (movie))
 Berlin International Film Festival (2017)
 Award: Documentary Amnesty International   (Devil´s Freedom (movie))
 Guadalajara International Film Festival (2017)
 Award: Mezcal  Best Documentary (Devil´s Freedom (movie))
 Guadalajara International Film Festival (2007)
 Award: Mayahuel  Best Mexican Fiction Film (Bad Habits)
 CineVegas International Film Festival  (2007)
 Award: La Próxima Ola Jury Prize Best Feature Film (Bad Habits)
 Montreal World Film Festival (2007)
 Award: Silver Zenith Best First Fiction Feature Film (Bad Habits)
 Bogota Film Festival (2007)
 Award: Circulo Precolombino de Oro Best Director, Best Feature Film (Bad Habits)
 AFI Dallas International Film Festival (2007)
 Narrative category Honorable Mention (Bad Habits)
Los Angeles Latino International Film Festival (2007)
 Award: Special Jury Award Best Work (Bad Habits)
International Film Festival Bratislava (2007)
 Nominated  GRAND PRI (Bad Habits)
 FIAP (2004)
 Award: Gold  Best Production House 
 Circulo de Oro(2002)
 Award: Grand Prix Televisión  Dormimundo, Gilbert DDB 
 FiPTUR Brasil
 Award: Grand Prix   Duracell, Ogilvy & Mather 
 Festival Internacional de Creatividad Cannes Lions(1997)
 Award: Bronce  Duracell, Ogilvy & Mather 
 Festival Internacional de Creatividad Cannes Lions
 Award: Gold  Aeromexico 
 Circulo Creativo de México(1998)
 Award: Gold  Afore Garante

References 

 FIAP Hall of Fame
 Latin Spots Reference
 
 Diario de un cocinero
 :es:Festival Internacional de Cine en Guadalajara

External links 
 PRODU | Simón Bross: Quisiéramos ver un poco más de recursos asociados a la comedia
 Ya es momento en que todo interactúe - Simón Bross
 Simón Bross La cuestión afectiva me ha crecido más a partir de que me dio cancer y me curé
Grandes directores detrás de la publicidad
Simón Bross presidirá el jurado de producción en el Fiap y Mariana Sá es la nueva CCO de WMcCann
Simón Bross: ‘Nosotros los nobles’ fue un parteaguas, pero la fórmula se desgastó
EDIÇÃO SERÁ UM GRANDE APRENDIZADO
Simón Bross: presidente de Jurado de Producción en el FIAP + PRODU Innovation Summit 2021(fiapawards on Instagram)
Simón Bross: Volver a los orígenes(LatinSpots Delivery)
Simon Bross será el presidente de Jurado de Producción en FIAP 2020(El Publicista)
Simon Bross será el presidente de jurado de Producción en FIAP 2020(TotalMedios)
Simón Bross - Presidente del Jurado de Producción FIAP 2020(PRODU)
Simón Bross y Fred Clapp Círculo Creativo México
FICM presenta proyección especial de El gallinero, de Fabián Ibarra
Cinéfagos - Malos Hábitos de Simón Bross
Comparte Simón Bross experiencias publicitarias
 Visitamos García Bross y esto sucedió | #RoastbriefPresenta
 Simón Bross: Un cazador al interior de las ideas
 Estoy encantado con la idea de ser presidente del jurado en el nuevo FIAP
 The Filmlot Interview - Simon Bross
 Rotten Tomatoes - Victoria Alexander
 Variety.com - Lisa Nesselson
 Cinevegas
 Exclaim! Magazine - Jessica Carroll
 Prost Amerika
 Interview Cinema Falado
 Bergen International Fil Festival (Norwegian premiere)
 Blog
 La Crónica México
 Film Threat
 Latino International Film Institute
 Meet in Chicago
 TheFilckChicks - Judy Thorburn
 Morbo Literario 2.0 - Malos Hábitos: Simón Bross
 Canal100 Sección Semanario - Simón Bross
 Revista Pantalla - Telemundo
 Televisa Espectáculos - Simón Bross y su trabajo en "Nosotros los Nobles"
 El Financiero - La Política decente empieza por ser buena persona
 Grandes directores detrás de la Publicidad GQ - México
 Latin Spots - Simon Bross
 Production House - Website
 Simón Bross: “Estoy encantado con la idea de ser presidente del jurado en el nuevo Fiap”
 Agencias creativas se reinventan ante el cambio

1960 births
Mexican film directors
Spanish-language film directors
Mexican film producers
People from Mexico City
Living people
Advertising directors